Tatyana Gennadiyevna Goyshchik (born July 6, 1952 in the village of Konovalov, Irkutsk Oblast) is a Soviet athlete who competed mainly in the 400 metres.

She trained at VSS Trud in Irkutsk. She competed for the USSR in the 1980 Summer Olympics held in Moscow, Russian SFSR in the 4 × 400 metres, where she won the gold medal with her teammates Tatyana Prorochenko, Nina Zyuskova and Irina Nazarova.

External links 
 Profile at Sports-Reference.com

References

1952 births
Living people
Soviet female sprinters
Athletes (track and field) at the 1980 Summer Olympics
Olympic athletes of the Soviet Union
Olympic gold medalists for the Soviet Union
People from Irkutsk Oblast
Medalists at the 1980 Summer Olympics
Olympic gold medalists in athletics (track and field)
Olympic female sprinters
Sportspeople from Irkutsk Oblast